A fire temple, Agiary, Atashkadeh, Atashgah or Dar-e Mehr is the place of worship for the followers of Zoroastrianism, the ancient religion of Iran (Persia). In the Zoroastrian religion, fire (see atar), together with clean water (see aban), are agents of ritual purity. Clean, white "ash for the purification ceremonies [is] regarded as the basis of ritual life", which "are essentially the rites proper to the tending of a domestic fire, for the temple [fire] is that of the hearth fire raised to a new solemnity". For, one "who sacrifices unto fire with fuel in his hand ..., is given happiness".

List of fire temples in Iran

See also 

 List of fire temples in India

References

Bibliography 
 

Fire temples